The Natal Open was a golf tournament in South Africa. It was part of the South African Tour.

Winners 
 1925 Jock Brews
 1926 Sid Brews
 1927 Sid Brews
 1928 No tournament
 1929 Sid Brews
 1930–1934 No tournament
 1935 Bobby Locke (amateur)
 1936 Bobby Locke (amateur) (301)
 1937 Sid Brews
 1938 Otway Hayes (amateur)
 1939 Jock Verwey
 1940–1945 No tournament
 1946 Otway Hayes
 1947 Eric Moore
 1948 Otway Hayes
 1949  No tournament
 1950 George Van Niekerk (299)
 1951 Sandy Guthrie (279)
 1952 Sandy Guthrie (291)
 1953 Bobby Locke
 1954 Bruce Keyter (amateur)
 1955 Denis Hutchinson (amateur)
 1956 Harold Henning (289)
 1957 Bruce Keyter (286)
 1958 Gary Player
 1959 Gary Player
 1960 Gary Player (282)
 1961 Harold Henning (278)
 1962 Stewart Davies
 1963 Sewsunker Sewgolum (293)
 1964 Cedric Amm
 1965 Sewsunker Sewgolum (285)
 1966 Gary Player (286)
 1967 Cobie Legrange (281)
 1968 Gary Player
 1969 Bobby Cole (282) 
 1970 Bobby Cole (285)
 1971 Terry Westbrook (283)
 1972 (Jan) Tienie Britz (282)
 1972 (Dec) Bobby Cole (277)
 1974 Bobby Cole (284)
 1975 John Fourie

Sources:

References

Golf tournaments in South Africa
Former Sunshine Tour events
Recurring sporting events established in 1925
Recurring sporting events disestablished in 1975